Rajesh Bhola (born 26 December 1958) is a social worker, psychotherapist, journalist, author, columnist and writer on spiritual subjects from India. Bhola also contributes to Inner Voice of the Hindustan Times

Personal life
Bhola was born on 26 December 1958 in Chandigarh, India. He writes a regular column on spiritualism in a newspaper Friday Gurgaon and contributes to The Times of India. He completed his post graduation in English literature with linguistics from Panjab University, Chandigarh. Later he received a degree of PhD in English literature.

Social work
Bhola founded Spastic Society of Gurgaon and is serving as its president, Spastic Society of Gurgaon is providing free of cost occupational therapy, medical care, speech therapy, special education, parents counselling, vocational training, rehabilitation, employment and medical insurance for children with autism, cerebral palsy, mental retardation and multiple disabilities.

Bibliography

See also 

 Spastic Society of Gurgaon
 ADAPT – Able Disable All People Together
 Malini Agarwal

References

External links 
Speaking Tree Blog
SSOG Website
Rajesh Bhola – Blog
Hindustan Times Archives
Power Politics – Art of Living

Living people
1958 births
Writers from Chandigarh
Indian bloggers
Indian columnists
Social workers
Panjab University alumni
Indian spiritual writers
Spiritual writers
Indian spiritual teachers
Spiritual teachers
Male bloggers